Maria Friedman ( Freedman; born 19 March 1960) is a British actress and director of stage and screen, best known for her work in musical theatre. 

She is an eight-time Olivier Award nominee, winning three. Her first win was for her 1994 one-woman show, By Special Arrangement. She has also twice won Best Actress in a Musical for the original London productions of Passion and Ragtime. 

She played Elaine Peacock on EastEnders from 2014 to 2017. She was the narrator in the 1999 straight to video version of Joseph and the Amazing Technicolor Dreamcoat.

Early years
Maria Freedman was born in Switzerland, the daughter of Clair Llewelyn (née Sims), a concert pianist, and Leonard Friedman ( Freedman), a violinist for the Royal Philharmonic Orchestra. Her younger sister is the theatre producer Sonia Friedman. Her father is from a Russian-Jewish immigrant family, whereas her mother is English. She began her education in Germany (where her family moved), and by the age of five moved with her family to England after the divorce of her parents.

Career
In 1989 she appeared in the lead female role of Hayyah in the play Ghetto by Joshua Sobol at the Olivier Theatre in London. In the following year she appeared in another Royal National Theatre production as Dot in Sunday in the Park with George by Stephen Sondheim.

She won an Olivier Award for her one-woman cabaret, Maria Friedman By Special Arrangement and another Olivier Award (Best Actress in a Musical) in 1997, starring in Sondheim's Passion. She appeared in Passion in the West End at the Queen's Theatre in 1996 as Fosca. She starred in Chicago in the West End at the Adelphi Theatre as Roxie starting in 1998.

In the 1999 film of Lloyd Webber's Joseph and the Amazing Technicolor Dreamcoat, she played the narrator. She played the role of Mother in the West End production of Ragtime at the Piccadilly Theatre starting in March 2003, winning the 2004 Olivier Award, Best Actress in a Musical.

In 2004 she originated the role of Marian Halcombe in Andrew Lloyd Webber's musical The Woman in White in the West End and on Broadway in 2005. As previews for The Woman in White started for the Broadway production, she was diagnosed with stage 1 breast cancer and left the show to have surgery to have the lump removed.  Less than a week after the surgery she returned to the stage for the previews and performed on the official opening night. She said she would begin radiation treatment for the cancer in December 2005. The Broadway production closed after only 109 performances on 22 February 2006, in part due to her and co-star Michael Ball's frequent absences due to illness. (Friedman had planned a six-week absence for further treatment, with Judy Kuhn to be her replacement, but remained for the duration of the run once the closing was announced.)

As well as other musical shows, Maria participated in Hey, Mr. Producer!, the concert celebrating the works of Sir Cameron Mackintosh, in which she sang "You Could Drive a Person Crazy," "Broadway Baby," and "How Many Tears?"  Similarly, she participated in Sondheim Tonight live at London's Barbican Centre, singing "Losing My Mind" (from Follies) and "More" (from the film Dick Tracy).  She has also had several one woman shows: Maria Friedman – By Special Arrangement and  Maria Friedman – By Extra Special Arrangement and has performed these in several top cabaret venues in both the UK (most recently at Trafalgar Studios) and New York City, including several engagements at the Café Carlyle.

She can be heard on many cast recordings; and has released several solo albums including Maria Friedman, Maria Friedman Live, Now and Then, and Maria Friedman Celebrates The Great British Songbook. Friedman has won three Laurence Olivier Awards and been nominated for seven.

In 2010, Friedman appeared as a soloist in the BBC Proms tribute to Stephen Sondheim at the Royal Albert Hall, London. She sang the role of Mrs. Lovett in Sweeney Todd opposite Bryn Terfel. In October 2014, Friedman joined the cast of EastEnders as Elaine Peacock, the mother of established character Linda Carter (Kellie Bright). She has since appeared in December 2014 and February to March 2015 to date, before returning for a three-month stint in September 2015.

Friedman has directed several musicals. In 2012 she directed a revival of Sondheim's Merrily We Roll Along, which started at the Menier Chocolate Factory and transferred to the West End at the Harold Pinter Theatre in April to July 2013. This production ran at the Huntington Theatre Company, Boston, Massachusetts starting in September 2017, directed by Friedman. In 2015, she directed a revival of High Society at The Old Vic Theatre. The production was played in the round. She directed a revival of Stepping Out in the West End Vaudeville Theatre in 2017.

Personal life 
Friedman has two sons: Toby Sams-Friedman (b. 1994) with director and writer Jeremy Sams; and Alfie Friedman (b. 2002) with cameraman Oleg Poupko. She was married to dancer Roland Brine; her boyfriend is Adrian Der Gregorian.

Stage productions
  Fiddler on the Roof (Golde) (2019)
 The Woman in White (Marian)
 Ragtime (Mother) (2003) (Olivier Award – Best Actress in a Musical)
 By Extra Special Arrangement
 Chicago (Roxie Hart) (1998)
 The Witches of Eastwick (Sukie)
 Blues in the Night
 By Special Arrangement (Olivier Award Best Entertainment)
 Passion (Fosca) (1996) (Olivier Award Best Actress in a Musical)
 Lady in the Dark (Liza Elliot)  
 April in Paris
 Ghetto (Hayyah) (1989)
 Sunday in the Park with George (Dot) (1990)
 Merrily We Roll Along (Haymarket Theatre, Leicester) (1992)
 The Break of Day (Royal Court, 1995)
 Square Rounds
 The King and I (Royal Albert Hall)

Filmography 
 Heil Honey I'm Home! (unaired episodes)
 Red Dwarf
 Casualty
 Hey Mr. Producer!
 Joseph and the Amazing Technicolor Dreamcoat (The Narrator)
EastEnders - Elaine Peacock (2014–2017)
The Sound of Music Live - Mother Abbess - UK version of The Sound of Music Live! broadcast 20 December 2015

Awards and nominations

References

External links

About Maria
Show Music Magazine article featuring an interview with Maria Friedman
London's Broadway Baby Photo Archive

1960 births
Living people
People educated at the Arts Educational Schools
English women singers
English people of Russian-Jewish descent
English television actresses
English stage actresses
English soap opera actresses
English sopranos
Laurence Olivier Award winners
20th-century English actresses
21st-century English actresses
Women theatre directors
Theatre World Award winners